Múm (stylized in lowercase) is an Icelandic indietronica band whose music is characterized by soft vocals, electronic glitch beats and effects, and a variety of traditional and unconventional instruments.

History 
The band was formed in 1997 by original members Gunnar Örn Tynes and Örvar Þóreyjarson Smárason, who were joined by twin sisters Gyða and Kristín Anna Valtýsdóttir. According to Kristín, the band's name was not intended to mean anything. Gyða left the band to return to her studies after the release of Finally We Are No One. In early 2006, Kristín also left the band, although it was not officially announced until 23 November of that year. With only Tynes and Smárason remaining in the group, a large group of new musicians were brought on board: guitarist/vocalist/violinist Ólöf Arnalds, trumpet/keyboard player Eiríkur Orri Ólafsson, vocalist/cellist Hildur Guðnadóttir, percussionist Samuli Kosminen, and multi-instrumentalist/vocalist Mr. Silla. The new collective of musicians recorded their fourth album during 2006; Go Go Smear the Poison Ivy was released on 24 September 2007.

Múm toured the East Coast of the US with German musician Volker "Hauschka" Bertelmann In November 2007. They returned in Spring 2008 with the same set list. Both tours included songs from the album, Go, Go Smear the Poison Ivy.

On 27 August 2008, they announced on their official website that "múm is quietly but surely [working on] their new album. No release date has been etched in stone, but every day will bring it closer." Múm also released several pictures of themselves during the recording process on their MySpace page.

During a 22 May 2009 concert in Burgos, Spain, Múm played songs from their newest album Sing Along to Songs You Don't Know. The album, recorded in Finland, Estonia, and Iceland, was released as a download through Gogoyoko on 17 August 2009, and on CD on 24 August 2009.

In December 2011, Múm released an EP called Gleðileg Jól (Merry Christmas in Icelandic) with traditional Icelandic Christmas songs. There are two songs plus one extra track.

On 1 June 2012, Múm released a compilation titled Early Birds, featuring 15 tracks recorded between 1998 and 2000. On 9 February 2013, a collaboration of theirs with Kylie Minogue called "Whistle" surfaced on SoundCloud.

Múm released their sixth album Smilewound in September, 2013 on CD, vinyl and digital download. On 7 September, it was released on cassette for Cassette Store Day.

In 2019, Morr Music celebrated the 20th anniversary of múm's debut album, Yesterday Was Dramatic – Today Is OK, by rereleasing it. Múm toured around Europe and China following this rerelease, and also announced a US tour that was to take place in March and April 2020.

Discography

Albums
 Yesterday Was Dramatic – Today Is OK (TMT, 1999; reissue Morr Music, 2005)
 Finally We Are No One (FatCat Records, 2002)
 Loksins erum við engin (Smekkleysa Records, 2002) — the Icelandic version of "Finally We Are No One"
 Summer Make Good (FatCat Records, 2004)
 Go Go Smear the Poison Ivy (FatCat Records, 2007)
 Sing Along to Songs You Don't Know (Morr Music, 2009)
 Smilewound (Morr Music, 2013)

Compilations
 Blái Hnötturinn (2001) — Soundtrack
 Motorlab No. 2 (2001) — 3 tracks contributed to compilation album by Kitchen Motors
 Please Smile My Noise Bleed (Morr Music, 2001) — 3 New Tracks + Remixes
 Remixed (TMT, 2001) — Versions of Yesterday Was Dramatic – Today Is Ok
 Fálkar (Smekkleysa Records, 2002) — contributed "Grasi Vaxin Göng"
 Wicker Park (soundtrack) (Lakeshore Records, 2004) — contributed "We Have a Map of the Piano"
 Screaming Masterpiece (2005) — Appeared in the documentary with the video for "Green Grass of Tunnel" and contributed the same song to the soundtrack.
 Friends of the Random Summer (2005) — 3 CD, Unofficial Release.
 Kitchen Motors Family Album/Fjölskyldualbúm Tilraunaeldhússins (Spring 2006) — contributed "Asleep in a Hiding Place"
 Early Birds (Morr Music, June 2012) — 15 rares, lost and unreleased tracks.

EPs
 The Ballað of the Broken Birdie Records (TMT, 2000)
 Dusk Log (FatCat Records, 2004)
 The Peel Session (FatCat Records, 2006) (Maida Vale 4 Studio 2002)
 Gleðileg Jól (A Number of Small Things, 2011)
 Mysteries (A Number of Small Things, 2013) 100 copies only
 Menschen am Sonntag - Live in Berlin (Morr Music, 2018)

Singles
 Green Grass of Tunnel (FatCat Records, 2002)
 Nightly Cares (FatCat Records, 2004)
 They Made Frogs Smoke 'til They Exploded (FatCat Records, 2007)
 Marmalade Fires (FatCat Records, 2007)
 Prophecies and Reversed Memories (Morr Music, 2009)
 "Whistle" (Parlophone, 2013)
 Toothwheels (Morr Music, 2013)
 When Girls Collide (Morr Music, 2013)

References

External links
 
Múm at FatCat Records

FatCat Records artists
Icelandic post-rock groups
Intelligent dance musicians
Folktronica musicians
Icelandic electronic music groups
Morr Music artists